Forbidden relationships in Judaism are intimate relationships which are forbidden by prohibitions in the Torah or rabbinical injunctions.

Some of these prohibitions—those listed in Leviticus 18, known as —are considered such a serious transgression of Jewish law that one must give up one's life, rather than transgress one of them. (This does not necessarily apply to a rape victim.) This is as opposed to most other prohibitions, in which one is generally required to transgress the commandment when a life is on the line.

Some of these prohibitions (such as those related to homosexuality), while still observed by Orthodox Jews, are currently observed to a lesser extent or not at all by some of the non-Orthodox movements.

Adultery 

Adultery is prohibited by the seventh of the Ten Commandments which says simply:
Thou shalt not commit adultery.

It is forbidden for a man to have sexual relations with a married woman not his wife.

Niddah 

A man is not allowed to have sexual relations with a woman—including his wife—during and shortly after her menstrual period, until after she immerses in a mikveh. A woman who has experienced her menstrual period and has not gone to a proper mikveh is referred to as a niddah.

Religious intermarriage 

Religious intermarriage is forbidden in Judaism. There are differing opinions among the rabbis as to when the prohibition on sexual relations with non-Jews is from the Torah, and when it is rabbinic.

Incest

Biblical prohibitions 
Sexual relations with certain close relatives are forbidden in the Hebrew Bible. Though they are generally called incestuous relations, the biblical list does not necessarily correspond to those prohibited under state laws. In the Hebrew Bible, sexual relationships between siblings are forbidden to Jews but permissible to Gentiles (non-Jews).

The relationships forbidden by Leviticus 18 are:

 One's genetic relative
 One's mother
 One's father
 One's stepmother
 One's paternal or maternal sister
 One's paternal sister through one's father's wife
 One's daughter (inferred from )
 One's granddaughter
 A woman and her daughter
 A woman and her granddaughter
 One's aunt by blood
 One's father's brother (uncle)
 One's father's brother's wife (aunt)
 One's daughter-in-law
 One's brother's wife (sister-in-law), with the exception of Yibum
 One's wife's sister (sister-in-law) during one's wife's lifetime, even if since divorced

Rabbinically prohibited relationships 
In addition to the relationships biblically prohibited to Jews, rabbis have gone further to prohibit additional relationships with various blood relatives or in-laws. These are called "Shni'ot" (secondary prohibitions or seconds). Some of these are:
 One's grandmother
 One's brother
 One's great-grandmother
 One's grandfather's wife
 One's great-grandfather's wife
 One's grandson's wife

Adopted children who are raised together are not permitted to marry because of appearances, even if they are not biologically related.

Exclusions from the assembly 

The Bible excludes certain categories of people from taking part in the qahal (assembly) of HaShem. Jewish tradition considers this to be solely a limitation on marriage.

Biblical peoples 

A Jew is prohibited from marrying a male Moabite and Ammonite convert; or an Egyptian or Edomite convert up to the third generation from conversion.

Nethinim/Gibeonites are prohibited by rabbinic injunction.

As the people currently living in those areas may not be descended from the original peoples, these prohibitions may not apply today.

Mamzer 

A mamzer in Jewish law is a child resulting from an incestuous liaison or an adulterous liaison by a married woman. (This is not necessarily the same definition as a bastard by other societies, as it does not include a child of an unmarried woman.) As a mamzer is excluded from the assembly, the Talmud forbids a marriage by an ordinary Jew to a mamzer. However, a mamzer may marry a convert or another mamzer, though their child would also be considered a mamzer.

Certain eunuchs 

Jewish tradition also forbids marriage to a man who has been forcibly emasculated; the Greek term spadon (Latin: spado) which is used to refer to such people, is used in the Septuagint to denote certain foreign political officials (resembling the meaning of eunuch). The Jewish prohibition does not include men who were born without visible testicles (conditions including cryptorchidism), or without a visible penis (intersex conditions can affect genital appearance). There is dispute, even in traditional Judaism, about whether this prohibited group of men should include those who have become, at some point since their birth, emasculated as the result of a disease.

Special rules for priests 
Israelite priests (kohanim) are not allowed to marry:

 divorcees
 converts
 a woman who has had certain forbidden sexual relationships (such as the zonah in the Torah)
 a woman who was born of the prohibited relations of a kohen (called a chalalah)
 women captured during warfare
 a widow whose brother-in-law refused to perform a levirate marriage, and she consequently performs the Halitzah ceremony

Some of these prohibitions are biblical, and some are rabbinical.

The Kohen Gadol (high priest) must also not marry a widow. He is required to marry a virgin maiden. However, if he was married to a woman otherwise permitted to a kohen, and was then elevated to the high priesthood, he may remain married to her.

Homosexual acts

Orthodox view 

Orthodox Judaism interprets as forbidding homosexual acts between two men, and calls it an abomination. ( specifically prohibits such relationships with one's father or uncle.)

There is no punishment prescribed in the Torah for sex acts between two women (lesbianism), but rabbinic law has prohibited it as an extension of the "activities of (ancient) Egypt" (see ). Although the practice is not considered adultery in the formal sense, the Talmud (Yevamot 76a), in the name of Rav Huna, suggests that women engaged in such practices are forbidden to marry a priest of Aaron's lineage. Others posit that such relationships do not prohibit the woman unto a kohen, since it is merely an act of lewdness. However, such practices are still censured and are said to be an infringement of the prohibition, "You shall not do as they do in the land of Egypt" (Leviticus 18:3).

Conservative view 

Conservative Judaism's Committee on Jewish Law and Standards has validated different approaches to homosexual acts, with one opinion being like the Orthodox position in many respects, and another opinion permitting many forms of homosexual sex, while continuing to regard anal intercourse between men as prohibited.

In 2012, the American branch of Conservative Judaism represented by the Rabbinical Assembly, devised a commitment ceremony for same-sex couples, though not defined as kiddushin. In 2014, the British group Masorti Judaism said it would support shutafut ceremonies for same-sex unions. In 2016, the Rabbinical Assembly passed a resolution supporting transgender rights.

Humanistic Judaism 
In 2004, the Society for Humanistic Judaism issued a resolution supporting "the legal recognition of marriage and divorce between adults of the same sex", and affirming "the value of marriage between any two committed adults with the sense of obligations, responsibilities, and consequences thereof".

Reform view 

Reform Judaism interprets Leviticus 18:22 as forbidding men from using sex as a form of ownership over men. Reform Jewish authors have revisited the Leviticus text, and ask why the text mentions that one should not lie with a man "as with a woman". If it is to be assumed that the Torah does not waste words, the authors ask why the Torah includes this extra clause. Most Reform Jews suggest that since intercourse involved possession (one of the ways in which a man "acquired" a wife was to have intercourse with her), similar to the Christian theology of using sex to "consummate" a marriage, it was abhorrent that a man might acquire another man—it is not the act of homosexual intercourse itself which is abhorrent, but using this act to acquire another man and therefore confuse the gender boundary.

Bestiality 

Men and women are forbidden from engaging in bestiality. It is considered an abomination according to the Torah.

Youth 

Rather than being seen as merely a literary device to quickly describe the populating of the earth, the mitzvah "Pru Urvu" (to "go forth and multiply") was interpreted by the classical rabbis to mean that it was the duty of every male Jew to marry as soon as possible. Several Talmudic rabbis urged that children should be married as soon as they had reached puberty.  Parents were legally able to marry off minor children. Despite the young threshold for marriage, marriages with a large age gap between the spouses (e. g., between a young man and an old woman) were thoroughly opposed by the classical rabbis.

The classical rabbis saw 18 as the ideal age to become married, and anyone unmarried after the age of twenty was said to have been cursed by God; rabbinical courts frequently tried to compel an individual to marry, if they had passed the age of twenty without marriage. Nevertheless, the classical rabbis viewed study of the Torah as a valid reason for remaining unmarried, although they were only rarely willing to regard life-long celibacy favourably. Since the classical rabbis viewed marriage as a duty deriving from the mitzvah to go forth and multiply, they also believed that the obligation was discharged once the husband had fathered both a son and a daughter; despite this, they also argued that no man should live without a wife even after he has several children.

Ability to give consent 

Children, however, were not regarded as old enough to make an informed decision, and so could not consent to marriage themselves, although marriage to a female child was still permissible if her father consented, whether she agreed to it or not; if the father was dead, such consent could be given by her mother, or her brothers, but in this latter case, the girl could annul the marriage when she reached the "standard" age of puberty (12), if she wished.

The mentally handicapped, and deaf-mutes, were also regarded, by traditional Jewish law, as being unable to give their consent; indeed, marriage to such people was forbidden. However, the rabbis allowed deaf-mutes to marry each other.

See also 
 Judaism and sexuality

References

Further reading 
 
 

Jewish marital law
Judaism and sexuality